Dehnar may refer to:

Dehnar, Mazandaran
Dehnar, Tehran